Forest Sciences and Technology Centre of Catalonia  (CTFC) is a centre for forest research based in Solsona, Lleida, and is among the leading applied research centres in Spain. It was founded in 1996 as a consortium of five local and regional institutions (the Consell Comarcal del Solsonès, the University of Lleida, the Diputació de Lleida, the Catalan Foundation for Research and Innovation, and the Catalan Government). The institution has grown to employ over one hundred professionals (including scientists, technicians, fellows and administrative personnel) who work in collaboration with different administrations, institutions and companies, and its annual budget is around 14 million euros.

The activity of the CTFC is not restricted to competitive research, but also covers the transfer of technology and of knowledge and training, representing an important volume of its activity and adding value to its results. The transfer of technology in shape of conferences with the private sector and public administrations complements the organisation of seminars for the wider public and agents of different sectors (management, proprietary, technical, administration and scientific, etc.); nationally and internationally contributing to the transfer of this knowledge and to the generation of debate. In the field of training, the activity of the CTFC embraces basic training for workers and continuing training and skills development at postgraduate and masters level, including many visiting students from other countries.

CTFC is part of the CERCA network of excellence research centre of the Government of Catalonia, in the core of the research ecosystem. It has an external scientific advisory board which makes an independent evaluation every 4 years (2012, 2016), with an obligation to implement its recommendations, and an overarching supervision by the Parliament of Catalonia.

Mission 
The mission of CTFC is to “Contribute to the modernization and to the competitiveness of the forest sector, to the rural development and the sustainable management of the natural environment, through research, transfer of  technology and knowledge to the society, and training.” 
 
The  main  activities  of  CTFC  have  traditionally  been  guided  by  its  mission.  However,  the complexity  of  the  forest  sector  in  Catalonia  and,  its  relative  weakness  compared  to  other 
economic sectors, has led to a reinterpretation of the mission by the CTFC in a research context. In  this  line,  the  main  motto  of  the  institution  has  been  expanded  in  order  to  focus  on  the 
exploration of the multifunctional nature of Mediterranean forests. Those have indeed a unique richness compared to other types of forests and beyond wood they include a large number of 
other marketed and non‐marketed products and services that deliver to societies, from biomass energy to mushrooms or water quality, biodiversity and fire risk reduction.  
 
CTFC has been implicated in several policy initiatives at regional & Mediterranean level, where its research results have directly been used within the policy processes: Regional Wood Biomass Strategy,  Natura 2000 ZECs, Overarching Forest Policy Plan (2012), FAO Tlemcen Declaration regarding Mediterranean forests (2013), Preventive Forest Management Strategy against Wild Fires (2015-2016), Wood Support Scheme (2015).

Vision 
The vision of the CTFC is to be recognised as a centre of reference at local, national and international levels in the fields of forest and rural development.

Main lines of research 
The R+D activity at CTFC is structured through six work programmes, which are connected to one another. Each one of those six work programmes is articulated in different action lines, not only in research but also in transfer of technology and training.

 Silviculture and forest management
 Forest production: wood and bioenergy
 Operation of ecosystems and biodiversity 
 Socioeconomic and forest politics
 Wildfires and other perturbations
 Non-wood forest products

Main principal investigators 
 Dr Lluis Brotons, Head of the Landscape Ecology Department
 Dra Miriam Piqué, Head of the Sustainable Forest Management Area
 Dr Lluis Coll, Head of the Forest Dynamics Department
 Ing. Gerard Bota, Head of the Biological Conservation Department
 Dr Pere Casals, Head of MAnagement of Silvopastoral Systems Department
 Dr Pere Rovira, Soils Sciences 
 Dr Jose-Ramon Gonzalez, Forest Disturbances Modelling
 Dr Jordi Camprodon, Biological Conservation
 Dr Jose-Antonio Bonet, Mushrooms production
 Dr Miquel de Caceres, Vegetation Modelling
 Dr Virgilio Hermoso, Environmental Decision Support
 Dr Jordi Garcia, Models Optimisation
 Dra Irina Prokofieva, Forest Economics
 Dra Teresa Sebastia, Head of the Functional Ecology Department
 Dr Damià Vericat, Hydrology
 Dr Carlos Colinas, Forest Pathology

Management

Scientific advisory board 
 Dr Yves Birot, INRA, France (2011-2015)
 Dra Isabel Cañellas, INIA, Spain (2011)
 Dr Christian Messier, CEF, Canada (2011)
 Dr Marc Palahi, EFI, Finland (2011)
 Dra Margaret Shannon, Univ. New York, USA (2011-2015)
 Dra Jordina Belmonte, ICTA, Spain (2016)
 Dr Pedro Beja, CIBIO, Portugal (2016)
 Dr Bart Muys, Univ. Leuven, Belgium (2011)
 Dr Andreas Kleinschmidt, FCBA, France (2011)

Location 
The headquarters is in Solsona, Lleida, a heavily wooded part of Catalonia. There are also permanent offices in Girona (Santa Coloma de Farners), Tarragona (Espluga de Francoli), Lleida (Parc scientific) and Barcelona (Recinte Sant Pau).

Within Solsona, it has two facilities: in the "Seminari", downtown Solsona, with activities related to the local community, and 2 km away from the city in the "Can Mascaro" area, with the research activities.

References

External links 
 Official website
 Publications

Forest research institutes
Research institutes in Catalonia
Forestry in Spain